Kalinić is a surname found in Croatia and Serbia. It may refer to:

People
Ivica Kalinić (b. 1956), former Croatian football player and manager
Lovre Kalinić (b. 1990), Croatian footballer
Nikola Kalinić (b. 1988), Croatian footballer
Nikola Kalinić (basketball) (b. 1991), Serbian basketballer
Pavle Kalinić (b. 1959), Croatian politician and writer
Sretko Kalinić, (b. 1974), Serbian gangster
Zoran Kalinić (b. 1958), former Yugoslav table tennis player

Places
Kalinić, Požega-Slavonia County, a village in eastern Croatia

Croatian surnames
Serbian surnames